James George Donald (4 June 1898 – 29 August 1981) was a New Zealand rugby union player and farmer. He was born in Tauherenikau, Wairarapa, New Zealand.

References

1898 births
1981 deaths
New Zealand farmers
New Zealand rugby union players
New Zealand international rugby union players
Rugby union players from the Wellington Region